Acontias breviceps, the shorthead lance skink or shortheaded legless skink, is a species of viviparous, legless, fossorial lizards occurring along the southern and eastern sections of the Great Escarpment in South Africa. It may grow up to 10 cm long.

This skink was first collected in 1925 by Robert Essex at Hogsback in the Amatola Mountains in the Eastern Cape at an elevation of some 6000 ft. A disjunct second population exist in the Transvaal Drakensberg. Essex collected for the Albany Museum of Grahamstown, but a fire in 1941 destroyed most specimens and records.

References

Bibliography
Daniels, Savel R.; Neil J. L. Heideman, Martin G. J. Hendricks, Keith A. Crandall 2006. Taxonomic subdivisions within the fossorial skink subfamily Acontinae (Squamata: Scincidae) reconsidered: a multilocus perspective. Zoologica Scripta 35 (4): 353
Essex, R. 1925. Descriptions of two new species of the genus Acontias and notes on some other lizards found in the Cape Province. Rec. Albany Mus. 3: 332–342.
Greer, Allen E. 2001. Distribution of maximum snout-vent length among species of Scincid lizards. Journal of Herpetology 35 (3): 383-395
Lamb, T.; Biswas, S. & Bauer, A.M. 2010. A phylogenetic reassessment of African fossorial skinks in the subfamily Acontinae (Squamata: Scincidae): evidence for parallelism and polyphyly. Zootaxa 2657: 33–46

breviceps
Skinks of Africa
Endemic reptiles of South Africa
Reptiles described in 1925
Taxa named by Robert Essex (herpetologist)